5α-Dihydrocorticosterone (5α-DHC, 5α-DHB), also known as 11β,21-dihydroxy-5α-pregnane-3,20-dione, is a naturally occurring, endogenous glucocorticoid steroid hormone and neurosteroid. It is biosynthesized from corticosterone by the enzyme 5α-reductase. DHC has central depressant effects and impairs long-term potentiation in animals.

See also
 Tetrahydrocorticosterone
 5α-Dihydroprogesterone
 Dihydrodeoxycorticosterone
 Tetrahydrodeoxycorticosterone
 Allopregnanolone

References

Diketones
Glucocorticoids
Neurosteroids
Pregnanes